Royale Academy is a public school located in Birati, West Bengal.

Academics

All the three streams Science, Commerce and Arts have been introduced from the session 2010–11. Admission will be made against available seat of each stream, strictly on the basis of marks obtained in Madhyamik Pariksha.

See also
Education in India
List of schools in India
Education in West Bengal

References

External links

Schools in North 24 Parganas district
Educational institutions established in 2012
2012 establishments in West Bengal